Kathryn Clarke may refer to:

 Kathryn Ann Clarke (born 1961), American writer living in Ireland
 Kathryn Clarke (politician) (1873–1940), member of the Oregon Senate